The Academy for Gifted Children is a non-denominational elementary and high school in Richmond Hill, Ontario, Canada (12 Bond Cres).  Entrance is by a competitive examination.  The school has been designed to support intellectually gifted children, and it allows children from grades 1 to 12 to enter.

The Academy for Gifted Children has made a modification to the usual system that Canadian public schools usually use.  Rather than simply allowing the students to proceed through grades 1 to 12, the Academy has merged grades 7 and 8 into one year, as well as added an extra year after grade twelve.  This is to allow students to graduate with significantly more credits than those graduating from public school; however, the students graduating from P.A.C.E. still graduate at the same age. Attending students have the option of selecting from a variety extra-curricular activities the school has to offer outside of regular school hours.

The Academy for Gifted Children, also known as P.A.C.E. (Programming for Academic and Creative Excellence), was founded in 1993 by former Earl Haig Secondary School teachers Dennis Reynolds & Barbara Rosenberg. It started off as an elementary school for grades 1-8 with 25 students, and has increased in admission since its inception. It currently has 330 students from Grade 1 through 12. P.A.C.E. used to have SK and a bigger building, and is planning to bring back SK and bring back the old version of the building in 2022. Rosenberg remained as the "director" (the term used for the principal) until the end of the 2018–2019 school year, when the vice-principal at the time, Janice Gruchy replaced Rosenberg as the director. Gruchy's role as the vice-principal was replaced by the former science teacher and head teacher, Caroline Corbit. The current school grounds was the former location of the Our Lady of the Annunciation Elementary School which moved to its new location east of Yonge Street in the early 1990s.

External links
Website of the academy

Education Cost Winners: 2003

Elementary schools in the Regional Municipality of York
High schools in the Regional Municipality of York
Gifted education
Private schools in Ontario
Education in Richmond Hill, Ontario
Educational institutions established in 1993
1993 establishments in Ontario